Doxpicomine (Doxpicodin, Doxpizodine) is a mild opioid analgesic drug. The drug acts as a mu-opioid receptor agonist. It is of fairly low potency, with a 400 mg dose of doxpicomine approximately equivalent in pain-killing effect to 8 mg morphine or 100 mg pethidine. It has been used as a lead compound to derive further analogues, although all compounds in this family are comparatively weak mu agonists.

References 

Dimethylamino compounds
Synthetic opioids
3-Pyridyl compounds
Dioxanes
Mu-opioid receptor agonists